We Thieves Are Honourable (Spanish:Los ladrones somos gente honrada) is a 1941 play by the Spanish writer Enrique Jardiel Poncela. The play is a comedy about a botched robbery at a suburban home. It has been adapted into films twice: We Thieves Are Honourable (1942) and We Thieves Are Honourable (1956).

References

Bibliography
 Goble, Alan. The Complete Index to Literary Sources in Film. Walter de Gruyter, 1999.

1941 plays
Spanish plays adapted into films